Lipowa  is a village in the administrative district of Gmina Grodków, within Brzeg County, Opole Voivodeship, in south-western Poland.

The village is served by Lipowa Śląska railway station, situated on the Brzeg - Nysa railway line (288).

References

Lipowa